Tufu'one is a village in Wallis and Futuna. It is located in Hihifo District on the northwest coast of Wallis Island. Its population according to the 2018 census was 167 people.

References

Populated places in Wallis and Futuna